Frankie Baldwin is a fictional character from the British ITV soap opera Coronation Street, played by Debra Stephenson. She was introduced as part of the Baldwin family along with Danny Baldwin (Bradley Walsh), Jamie Baldwin (Rupert Hill) and Warren Baldwin (Danny Young). She made her first appearance during the episode airing on 6 June 2004. Stephenson quit the role in 2006 and Frankie departed on screen on 31 December 2006.

Storylines
Glamorous Frankie met her husband Danny (Bradley Walsh) when she worked as a babysitter for his son Jamie (Rupert Hill). Even though he was still married to his first wife Carol, Frankie could not resist sleeping with Danny, as she had fallen in love with him. They had a son of their own, Warren (Danny Young), and she also became close to her stepson Jamie after she married Danny. He cheated on her numerous times, but she continued to forgive him until he cheated on her with Jamie's girlfriend Leanne Battersby (Jane Danson).

Upon entering Weatherfield, Frankie appeared stuck up and prissy, eager for Danny to sell the house they shared in London so they could move into somewhere more suitable. Frankie exploded when she discovered Danny had slept with Sunita Parekh (Shobna Gulati), and declared war on her. This perhaps is what drew her to Sunita's nemesis Maya Sharma (Sasha Behar). However, after learning of Maya's true nature, she apologised to Sunita and forgave her.

After a while, Frankie began to settle into the street more - especially after striking up a bond with Vera Duckworth (Liz Dawn). When Vera was ill, Frankie took care of her by doing her chores for her, filling in her job for her and advised her husband Jack (Bill Tarmey) to be more sensitive and attentive to Vera's needs. This led to Frankie securing a permanent position at the cafe, where she works with enemy Leanne.

Frankie saw Leanne as not worthy for Jamie, and became suspicious of her cheating on him. Frankie discovered Leanne's affair with her husband Danny when Leanne lost her phone. Leanne and Danny had arranged to meet at a hotel but Leanne cancelled at the last minute. Annoyed, Danny rang her phone and said all the things he wanted to do to Leanne - not aware that Frankie was on the other end of the line. Frankie chucked Danny out and from then on she lived with Jamie, and Jamie's mother Carol (Lynne Pearson). But after Carol accused Frankie and Jamie of sleeping with each other, Frankie kicked Carol out, and Carol left the street for good.

Danny, regretting losing her and scared at the thought of spending the rest of his life with Leanne, begged Frankie to take him back.  Frankie remained strong and the divorce went ahead, with Frankie moving boyfriend Nathan in just days before. She celebrated her divorce by jetting off alone for a holiday in her newly acquired Villa in Spain.

In October 2006 Frankie's former stepson Jamie declared his love for her at Fred Elliott's (John Savident) funeral and they kissed but the revelation shocked her and drove her back into the arms of ex-husband Danny. However she couldn't resist Jamie's advances and they embarked on a relationship, much to the disgust of the other residents of the street. The news also led to Danny disappearing.

Frankie and Jamie decided to head to Spain to start afresh, but at the last minute on New Year's Eve 2006, Frankie got cold feet.  She ended it with a devastated Jamie, and left to stay with a friend in Essex.  As she departed in a taxi, Jamie was consoled by friend Sean Tully (Antony Cotton).  But the misery wasn't over - at midnight Jamie received a call from father, Danny, telling him he had sold the flat and he was "sorry" to hear about his break up with Frankie.

In 2009, Roy (David Neilson) and Hayley Cropper (Julie Hesmondhalgh) are invited to Frankie's wedding to a footballer in Coronation Street: Romanian Holiday, but they arrive a week late. Frankie lets them stay in her villa while she is honeymooning.

Creation and development

On 6 May 2004, it was announced that former Bad Girls actress Debra Stephenson had joined Coronation Street as Frankie.

One storyline in 2005 saw Frankie's husband Danny have an affair with Leanne Battersby (Jane Danson). Frankie later discovered the affair when she answers Leanne's mobile and finds her husband is on the other end. Danny had organised to spend another night with Leanne holed-up in a hotel room. When Leanne doesn't show, Danny rings her to find out where she is, but he does not realise it's his wife answering the phone. Seeing her husband's name come up on the mobile, Frankie has answered, and mimicked Leanne's voice. Danny, who has told his wife he is away on business, says he has booked the best hotel room. Frankie tells him: "It's not Leanne, it's me,"  and orders Danny to come home. Frankie kept the affair secret in order to protect Danny's son Jamie (Rupert Hill).

On 14 May 2006, it was announced that Stephenson had quit her role as Frankie. Stephenson said: "I had originally only planned to stay for two years but I didn't anticipate how much I would enjoy playing Frankie. I'm also keen to pursue other acting projects and I'm very excited about what the future holds." A Coronation Street spokeswoman said: "Debra has been a great asset to the show and her portrayal of Frankie Baldwin has been fantastic. However, when she joined the show we were aware that she only planned to stay for two years and we fully appreciate her reasons for leaving. We wish her every success for the future."

References

External links

Coronation Street characters
Television characters introduced in 2004
Fictional waiting staff
Female characters in television